The following list includes notable people who were born or have lived in Columbus, Ohio, in alphabetical order by last name.

Actors
Chet Allen (1939–1984), television, Amahl and the Night Visitors on Hallmark Hall of Fame; Bonino; member of the Columbus Boychoir
Lexi Allen (1967– ), gospel singer and television personality; born in Columbus and a prominent figure in The Word Network
Majel Barrett (1932–2008), television (Star Trek, Star Trek: The Next Generation); born in Columbus
Warner Baxter (1889–1951), film (In Old Arizona); born in Columbus and lived there until age nine
Richard Biggs (1960–2004), actor; born in Columbus
Andrea Bowen (1990– ), actress; born in Columbus
Grace Cunard (1893–1967), actress, screenwriter, and film director; born in Columbus
Beverly D'Angelo (1951– ), film (National Lampoon's Vacation series); born and raised in Columbus
Alana de la Garza (1976– ), television (Law & Order); born in Columbus
Dody Goodman (1915–2008), television (Mary Hartman, Mary Hartman); born in Columbus
Eileen Heckart (1919-2001), actress; born in Columbus
Elsie Janis (1889–1956), vaudeville performer, screenwriter, actress and composer; born in Columbus and maintained a home there
A.J. Langer (1974– ), television (My So-Called Life); born in Columbus and lived there until age five
Andrew Levitt (1979– ), actor; also known as Nina West- born in Greentown, resident of Columbus, Rupaul's Drag race season 11 star 
Lorissa McComas (1970-2009), actress and glamour model; born in Columbus
Marnie McPhail (1966- ), actress and musician; born in Columbus
Tom Poston (1921–2007), television (Newhart); husband of Suzanne Pleshette; born in Columbus
Josh Radnor (1974– ), television (How I Met Your Mother); born in Columbus
Gigi Rice (1965– ), television (The John Larroquette Show); born in Columbus
Gene Sheldon (1908–1982), television (Disney's Zorro); born in Columbus
Cory Michael Smith, actor, best known for his role as Edward Nigma (Riddler) in the Fox television drama series Gotham
Julia Swayne Gordon (1878–1933), actress; born in Columbus
Philip Michael Thomas (1949– ), actor; born in Columbus
Hal Williams (1938– ), actor; born in Columbus

Artists
Benny Alba (1949– ), artist; born in Columbus
George Bellows (1882–1925), realist painter, known for bold depictions of urban life in New York City, becoming, according to Columbus Museum of Art, "the most acclaimed American artist of his generation"
Charles Csuri (1922–2022), father of digital art and computer animation
Ray Evans (1887–1954), political cartoonist
Natalia Fedner (1983– ), fashion designer, raised in Columbus, Ohio
Shawn Foster (1973– ), music video, film and television director
Alex Grey (1953– ), psychedelic artist; born in Columbus and attended Columbus College of Art and Design
Janet Cook Lewis (1855-1947), painter, librarian and bookbinder
Jammes Luckett (1974- ), musician, writer, visual artist, and voice actor; born in Columbus
Todd Douglas Miller, filmmaker
Christopher Ries (1952– ), sculptor; born in Columbus and attended the Ohio State University
Aminah Robinson (1940–2015), artist; born in Columbus
Alice Schille (1869–1955), watercolorist and painter
Chris Sprouse (1966– ), comic book artist
T. S. Sullivant (1854–1926), cartoonist and illustrator
Ted Williams (1958– ), voiceover artist who became an overnight celebrity when his YouTube video went viral in January 2011

Architects
Nathan Kelley (1808–1871)
Frank Packard (1866–1923)

Athletes

Miller Anderson (1922-1965), diver; born in Columbus
Simone Biles (1997– ), gymnast, three-time world all-around champion, 2016 Olympian, won four gold medals; born in Columbus
Jake Blankenship (1994– ), professional pole vaulter; raised in Columbus; attended Gahanna Lincoln High School
Alexa Bliss (1991– ), professional wrestler; born and raised in Columbus
Lisa Bonder (1965- ), tennis player; born in Columbus
Malaki Branham (2003- ), basketball player; born in Columbus
 Mike Brown (1970- ), basketball coach; born in Columbus
Trey Burke (1992– ), NBA guard, plays for the Houston Rockets; born in Columbus
Russ Campbell (1969– ), NFL tight end for the Pittsburgh Steelers; born in Columbus
Howard Cassady (1934–2019), NFL running back and Heisman Trophy winner; born in Columbus; played football and baseball for Ohio State
Austin Cindric (1998– ), NASCAR driver
Casey Close (1963– ), baseball player
Mark Coleman (1964– ), professional fighter from the UFC and Pride mixed-martial-arts organizations; member of Columbus-based Team Hammer House
Zach Collaros (1988– ), Canadian Football League quarterback for the Hamilton Tiger-Cats
Carl Cooke (1889-1971), sprinter; born in Columbus
Joe Cooper (1979– ), professional football player
Ben Curtis (1977– ), professional golfer, winner of 2003 British Open; born in Columbus
Antonio Daniels (1975- ), basketball player; born in Columbus
Helen Darling (1978– ), WNBA guard; attended high school in Columbus
Jessica Davenport (born 1985), basketball player
Buster Douglas (1960– ), heavyweight boxing champion after defeating Mike Tyson; born and raised in Columbus
Nate Ebner (1988– ), football player in the National Football League; rugby Olympian; lived in Columbus as a youth
Pat Elflein (1994– ), NFL player, born and raised in Columbus and graduated from The Ohio State University
Sarah Fisher (1980– ), auto racer, drove in nine Indianapolis 500s; born in Columbus
John Frank (1962– ), NFL football player
Ross Friedman (1992– ), Harvard and Major League Soccer player
Lawrence Funderburke (1970– ), Ohio State and NBA basketball player; born and raised in Columbus
Terry Glenn (1974–2017), Ohio State University and NFL wide receiver; born and raised in Columbus
Hank Gowdy (1889–1966), Major League Baseball catcher; born and lived in Columbus
Brian Grant (1972– ), basketball player
Archie Griffin (1954– ), only two-time Heisman Trophy winner; attended Eastmoor High School, then the Ohio State University; won the Heisman Trophy twice as a running back for the OSU Buckeyes; returned to Columbus after his pro career to become the university's assistant athletic director, and president of its alumni association
Forrest Griffin (1979– ), UFC light-heavyweight fighter and winner of the first season of The Ultimate Fighter; born in Columbus
Andrew Hampsten (1963– ), professional cyclist; born in Columbus
Sam Hanks (1914-1994), race car driver; born in Columbus
Chic Harley (1894–1974), Ohio State University All-American football player
Bo Lamar (1951– ), basketball player
Chris Leitch (1979– ), Major League Soccer defender; born in Columbus
Caris LeVert (1994– ), basketball player
Pauline Martin, All-American Girls Professional Baseball League player (1946 season)
Liam McCullough (1997– ), NFL long snapper for the Atlanta Falcons; born in Columbus
Lance Moore (1983– ), NFL wide receiver for the New Orleans Saints; born in Columbus
Jack Nicklaus (1940– ), pro golfer, winner of a record 18 golf majors and member of World Golf Hall of Fame; born in Columbus and attended the Ohio State University; won the 1961 NCAA Championship while playing for the school
Roosevelt Nix (1992– ), NFL fullback for the Pittsburgh Steelers; born and raised in Columbus; attended high school in Reynoldsburgh and played college football at Kent State
Abuchi Obinwa (1997– ), professional soccer midfielder; born in Columbus and plays for Columbus Crew SC
Paul O'Neill (1963– ), Major League Baseball outfielder; born and raised in Columbus
Danny O'Rourke (1983– ), Major League Soccer midfielder; born and raised in Columbus
Lilia Osterloh (1978– ), tennis player
Jesse Owens (1913–1980), track and field; set three world records in one day while in college at the Ohio State University; won four gold medals at the 1936 Olympics; raised in Cleveland, and attended college in Columbus
Jerry Page (1961- ), boxer; born in Columbus
Alexis Peterson (1995- ), basketball combo guard; born in Columbus
Brady Quinn (1984– ), NFL quarterback; born in Columbus and attended high school in Dublin, Ohio
Madison Rayne (1986-), Professional Wrestler for TNA Impact and All Elite Wrestling.
Michael Redd (1979– ), Ohio State University basketball player and NBA shooting guard; born and raised in Columbus
Dave Roberts (1944–2009), Major League Baseball pitcher; moved to Columbus
Mauri Rose (1906–81), auto racer
Jack Roslovic (1997– ), NHL player, Columbus Blue Jackets
Randy Savage (1952–2011), professional wrestler, former WWE champion; born in Columbus
Devon Scott (born 1994), basketball player in the Israel Basketball Premier League
Kip Selbach (1872–1956), Major League Baseball outfielder; born in Columbus
Cole Sillinger (2003– ), NHL player, Columbus Blue Jackets; born in Columbus
George Simpson (1908-1961), sprinter; born in Columbus
Spencer Strider (1998-), MLB player, starting pitcher for the Atlanta Braves; born in Columbus
Jared Sullinger (1992– ), CBA forward for the Shenzhen Leopards; born in Columbus and played for Ohio State
Nick Swisher (1980– ), Major League Baseball outfielder; attended the Ohio State University
Thelma Thall (1924– ), two-time world table tennis champion
Wil Trapp (1993– ), Major League Soccer midfielder; plays for Minnesota United FC and grew up in Gahanna
Gary Trent (1974– ), NBA player; attended Hamilton Township High School and was born and raised in Columbus
Louie Vito (1988– ), professional snowboarder, 2010 US Olympic Team, four-time Overall US Grand Prix Champion and two-time Dew Cup Overall Champion; six career X Games medals, including two gold medals; born in Columbus
Granville Waiters (1961–2021), NBA player; born and raised in Columbus
Samaki Walker (1976– ), NBA player; born and raised in Columbus
Evan White (1996– ), Major League Baseball player; born in Columbus
Herb Williams (1958– ), NBA player and coach; born in Columbus and played basketball for the Ohio State University
Jarren Williams (1997– ), NFL defensive back for New York Giants; born and raised in Columbus
John Williamson (1986– ), basketball player for Hapoel Tel Aviv B.C. of the Israeli Basketball Premier League
Blaine Wilson (1974– ), gymnast, Olympic silver medalist in 2004; attended the Ohio State University

Diplomats
James Linn Rodgers (1861–1930), United States Consul General to Shanghai, Havana and Montreal (also editor of Columbus Dispatch)

Entrepreneurs
Jeni Britton Bauer (1973-), founder of Jeni's Splendid Ice Creams
Dick Cepek (1930–1983), Off-road Motorsports Hall of Fame member, parts supplier and racer; raised in Columbus
Jack Hanna (1947– ), zookeeper and television personality; director of the Columbus Zoo and Aquarium (1978–1993), director emeritus afterwards
John H. McConnell (1923–2008), founder of Worthington Industries and the Columbus Blue Jackets NHL team
Jay Schottenstein (1954– ), entrepreneur and philanthropist
Dave Thomas (1932–2002), founder of Wendy's restaurant chain, whose first store was in Columbus
Robert D. Walter (1944– ), founder of Cardinal Health, born and raised in Columbus
Leslie Wexner (1937– ), founder and chairman emeritus of L Brands
Granville Woods (1856–1910), inventor; spent his early childhood in Columbus

Journalists
Charlotte Curtis (1928–1987), reporter and editor for the Columbus Citizen and the New York Times
Wil Haygood (1954– ), Pulitzer-nominated, award-winning journalist Washington Post; wrote the article that inspired the movie The Butler
Charles F. Hockett (1916-2000), American linguist; born in Columbus
Terry Murphy, television journalist, Chicago and Los Angeles news anchor, host of shows Hard Copy and Extra; born in Columbus
Sacha Pfeiffer (1971– ), award-winning journalist with the Boston Globe
Cabot Rea, Emmy Award-winning television reporter and anchor for the Columbus NBC affiliate WCMH; anchored the local UPN news at WWHO
Cora Rigby, first woman at a major paper to head a Washington News bureau and was one of the founders of the Women's National Press Club. 
James Linn Rodgers (1861–1930), editor of Columbus Dispatch (also United States Consul General to Shanghai, Havana and Montreal)
Dana Tyler, news anchor at WBNS
Ralph Waldo Tyler (1860–1921), journalist and war correspondent during World War I
Andrew Welsh-Huggins, journalist and author of the Andy Hayes mystery novels, set in Columbus

Military personnel
Casper H. Conrad Jr. (1872-1954), U.S. Army brigadier general
Cordelia E Cook (1919–1996), World War II U.S. Army first lieutenant in the United States Army Nurse Corps
Donald G. Dunn (1923–2021), World War II decorated member of the 10th Mountain Division
Donn Eisele (1930–1987), NASA astronaut; Colonel, U.S. Air Force
Linda L. Fagan (1963– ), Coast Guard vice admiral
Stanley H. Ford (1877-1961), United States Army General
Gilbert C. Hoover (1894–1980), World War I and World War II USN admiral, involved in developing the nuclear bomb
Curtis LeMay (1906–1990), World War II and Cold War U.S. Air Force general; born and raised in Columbus; studied civil engineering at the Ohio State University
Irvin McDowell (1818-1885), army officer; born in Columbus
Eddie Rickenbacker (1890–1973), World War I fighter pilot, "Ace of Aces"; born and raised in Columbus
Willard Franklyn Searle (1924–2009), Captain, U.S. Navy Supervisor of Salvage 1964–1969; born and raised in Columbus
Richard Secord (1932– ), Air Force major general
Walter Cowen Short (1870–1952), US Army brigadier general
Paul Tibbets (1915–2007), World War II Enola Gay decorated pilot

Miss America
Mary Katherine Campbell (1905–1990), Miss America 1922; born and raised in Columbus and attended the Ohio State University
Laurie Lea Schaefer, Miss America 1972

Musicians
əkoostik hookah, musical group
Attack Attack!, metalcore band
Beartooth, hardcore punk band
Blueprint, rapper and hip hop producer
Bizzy Bone (1976– ), rapper, part of Bone Thugs-n-Harmony
Bow Wow (1987– ), (formerly known as "Lil' Bow Wow"), rapper; born in Columbus and spent his early childhood there
Happy Chichester, singer-songwriter
Colin Rigsby, singer-songwriter Vesperteen, also drummer for House of Heroes
Copywrite, underground hip-hop artist
The Crimson Armada, metalcore band
Jay DeMarcus (1971– ), bassist in the country group Rascal Flatts; born and raised in Columbus
Rocco Di Pietro (1949– ), composer
Aaron Diehl (1985– ), jazz pianist 
Jerome Dillon (1969– ), drummer and musician, formerly of Nine Inch Nails
Josh Dun (1988– ), drummer of rock duo Twenty One Pilots
Early Man, speed metal band
Harold "Sweets" Edison (1915–1999), jazz trumpeter of the swing/bebop era who played and recorded with Coleman Hawkins, Ben Webster, and Count Basie; born in Columbus and attended East High School
FanFan (范玮琪) (1976– ), Taiwanese-American artist; born in Columbus
Fly Union, musical group
Michael Feinstein (1956– ), singer; born in Columbus and lived there until age 19
Terry Glaze, original lead singer of heavy metal band Pantera
Stomp Gordon, jump blues pianist and singer
House of Heroes, Christian rock band
Illogic (1980– ), rapper and hip-hop artist
Howard Jones (1970– ), lead vocalist of Light the Torch (formerly Devil You Know), former lead vocalist of Killswitch Engage and Blood Has Been Shed
Tyler Joseph (1988– ), lead vocalist of rock duo Twenty One Pilots
Like Moths to Flames, metalcore band
Rahsaan Roland Kirk (1935–1977), jazz saxophonist; born and raised in Columbus, and educated at the Ohio State School for the Blind
Latto, (1998– ), rapper
Gary LeVox (1970– ), lead singer of country group Rascal Flatts
Joe "Foley" McCreary, bass player for Miles Davis
Nancy Jewel McDonie singer, who became famous with the Korean KPop group Momoland 
Mulatto (1998– ), rapper; born in Columbus
My Ticket Home, alternative metal band
O.A.R., roots rock band
Phil Ochs (1940–1976), folk-activist singer and songwriter; grew up in Columbus, which provided the inspiration for his song "Boy in Ohio"; studied journalism at Ohio State University
Don Patterson (1936–1988), jazz organist
Penny & The Quarters, short-lived 1970s soul band that came to notice in 2011
Rascal Flatts, country band formed in Columbus
Conrad Reeder (1954– ), singer/songwriter
Red Wanting Blue, alternative rock band
John Reuben (1979– ), Christian rapper
RJD2 (1976– ), real name Ramble Jon "RJ" Krohn; hip-hop producer
Saving Jane, alternative rock band
Starset, alternative rock band
Caleb Shomo (1992– ), lead vocalist of Beartooth, former lead vocalist/keyboardist of Attack Attack!
Jermaine Stewart, an American R&B singer best known for his 1986 hit single "We Don't Have to Take Our Clothes Off", which peaked at number five on the Billboard Hot 100. Born in Columbus.
The Sun, alternative rock band
Camu Tao (1977–2008), rapper and producer, member of S.A. Smash
Times New Viking, indie rock band
Twenty One Pilots, alternative rock music duo from Columbus
Joe Walsh (1947– ), musician, solo artist, guitarist for The Eagles
Nancy Wilson (1937–2018), singer
Dwight Yoakam (1956– ), country singer; raised in Columbus and briefly attended Ohio State

Politicians
Prescott Bush (1895–1972), U.S. Senator elected from Connecticut, father and grandfather of Presidents George H. W. Bush and George W. Bush, respectively; born in Columbus and spent his childhood there until 1908; moved back to Columbus for part of 1923 for a job in business
Patrick Clifford, member of the Wisconsin State Assembly, born in Columbus
Richard Cordray, 1st Director of the Consumer Financial Protection Bureau, born in Columbus 
Bob Hackett, Ohio State Senator
Mark Kersey, member of the San Diego City Council, born in Columbus
Milton Latham (1827-1882), politician, governor of California, U.S. Representative and U.S. Senator; born in Columbus
Pat McCrory (1956– ), 74th Governor of North Carolina (2013–2017), longest-serving mayor of Charlotte, North Carolina; born in Columbus, but relocated to North Carolina as a child; 2008 Republican nominee for Governor of North Carolina
Harley Rouda (1961- ), attorney, businessman and politician, U.S. representative for California's 48th congressional district; born in Columbus
Bob Shamansky (1927-2011), politician and attorney, Member of the U.S. House of Representatives
from Ohio's 12th district; born in Columbus

Writers
Hanif Abdurraqib (1983– ), poet and aurthor; raised in Columbus
David Auburn (1970– ), playwright; raised in Columbus
Lois McMaster Bujold (1949– ), science fiction author; born in Columbus
Ron Burch, TV writer and producer, screenwriter, playwright and novelist; born and raised in Columbus and attended the Ohio State University
Charlotte Curtis (1928–1987), first woman editor of the New York Times, born in Columbus and worked at the Columbus Citizen for 11 years. See Journalists above.
Natalie Dee, webcomic artist; creator of Natalie Dee; co-creator of Married to the Sea with husband Drew; lives in Columbus
Drew (1979– ), webcomic artist, creator of toothpaste for dinner and co-creator of Married to the Sea; lives in Columbus
Florence Magruder Gilmore (1881-1945), author and settlement worker
Fred Golan (1959– ), television writer and executive producer; raised in Columbus, studied at Ohio State
Margaret Peterson Haddix (1964– ), author; lives in Columbus
Saeed Jones, writer and poet
Harvey C. Mansfield, Jr. (1932– ), Professor of Government at Harvard University; author of numerous books on the subject of political theory; graduated from high school in Columbus
Lida Rose McCabe (1865-1938), author, journalist, lecturer
Tom Meek (1965– ), columnist; lived in Columbus in 1976
Mary Robison (1949– ), short story writer
Arthur M. Schlesinger, Jr. (1917–2007), historian and writer; born in Columbus
Jeff Smith (1960– ), cartoonist and creator of Bone; grew up and currently lives in Columbus
Maggie Smith, poet, freelance writer, and editor, born in Columbus
Donald Ogden Stewart (1894–1980), humorist, playwright, and Academy Award-winning black-listed screenwriter; born and raised in Columbus
R. L. Stine (1943– ), author; born and raised in Columbus; attended the Ohio State University
James Thurber (1894–1961), cartoonist and humorist; born and raised in Columbus; many of his short stories depict episodes from this period of his life

Other
Ted Allen (1968– ), author and television personality, Queer Eye, Chopped; born in Columbus
Joshua Angrist, economist; born in Columbus
Roman Atwood (1983– ), Youtube personality, comedian, vlogger from Columbus
Neal Buckon (1953- ), prelate of the Roman Catholic Church; born in Columbus
Neil Carpathios (1961– ), poet, professor, newspaper columnist, radio program host
Annie W. Clark (1843-1907), president, Ohio Woman's Christian Temperance Union
Mark Dindal (1960– ), effects animator and director, Cats Don't Dance, The Emperor's New Groove; born and raised in Columbus
Chris Douridas (1962– ), radio host, actor, music supervisor
Guy Fieri (1968– ), chef on Food Network, born in Columbus
Judah Folkman (1933–2008), medical scientist who founded the field of angiogenesis research; raised in Columbus, and graduated from the Ohio State University
 Michael Foreman (1957- ), astronaut; born in Columbus
Mark Frissora, CEO of Caesars Entertainment
Lincoln Goodale (1782–1868), doctor and namesake of Goodale Park
David E. Harris, the first African American commercial airline pilot and pilot captain for a major U.S. commercial airline. 
Sandra Hubby (1978– ), Playboy Playmate and beauty pageant contestant; represented Columbus in the Miss Hawaiian Tropic Pageant
Curtis Lovell II (1981– ), illusionist, escape artist and endurance artist
Jeffrey L. Meikle (1949– ), cultural historian, professor
Ruth Ella Moore (1903-1994), academician, bacteriologist, microbiologist, and fashion designer, born in Columbus, awarded a Ph.D. of historical note in 1933 by Ohio State University, professor and department chair at Howard University 
Alexis Nikole Nelson (1992– ), forager and internet celebrity
J. Havens Richards (1851–1923), Jesuit and president of Georgetown University
Galen Starr Ross (1895–1980), academic and college president
Ann Shaw (1921–2015), civic leader, social worker
Randy Skinner (1952– ), Broadway director and choreographer; born and raised in Columbus; graduated from the Ohio State University in 1974
Howard Dwight Smith (1886–1958), architect of, most notably, Ohio Stadium; graduated from the Ohio State University in 1907

See also
Mayors of Columbus, Ohio
People associated with Capital University
People associated with the Ohio State University

References

Columbus, Ohio
Columbus, Ohio
People